Taim Hasan (born February 17, 1976) is a prominent Syrian actor, known for his distinct dramatic roles in Syria and the Arab world. Hasan achieved fame in Syria through a number of highly acclaimed and extremely successful Syrian series most notably Saladin, Taifas and Nizar Qabbani. Taking on the title role in the Egyptian series King Farouk, Hassan's latest role has established him as one of the leading stars in the Arab world. He appeared perennially with Hatem Ali, one of Syria's leading directors, in a majority of his series such as The Philanderer Salem (2000), Saladin (2001), Taifas (2005) and King Farouk (2007), a role that earned him a best actor's award by Egyptian audiences and critics and earned him vast recognition and success and established him as one of the leading actors of his generation. He has also starred in The Waiting (2006). He is best known for his role as Abboud, a man who does not have a family, and he loved and cared for by the people of his new town.

Life and career
Taim Hasan, originally from Al-Shaykh Badr, was born on February 17, 1976, in Tartus, Syria's second-largest port city. By the age of 4 or 5, he moved with his family to Damascus. He comes from a middle-class Syrian family that had no prior connection with the film business. His father, who finished his education in Germany, is a German language teacher whereas his mother is an Arabic language teacher. On July 1, 2004, he married the Syrian actress Dima Bayaa and they have two children named Ward and Fahad.
He has confirmed that when he first applied to the Higher Institute of Dramatic Arts, he was rejected. However, when he applied for the second time in front of a committee headed by the Syrian actor Jamal Suliman, who was able to see the high potential and promise in Hassan, he was accepted. 
Since his graduation from the High Institute for Dramatic Arts in 2001, Hassan was able to establish himself through taking influential roles in some of the most renowned Syrian television series. His first remembered role came in the year 2000 (while still completing his degree at the High Institute for Dramatic Arts) in the Syrian series The Philanderer Salem directed by Syrian director Hatem Ali.  In the following year, Hassan took on his breakthrough role in the series Saladin also directed by Hatem Ali in which Hassan played the role of "the Fatimid Caliph Al-Aded Ledin Allah". By the year 2006, Hassan has starred in a number of Syrian series with some of Syria's most renowned and respected actors such as Jamal Suliman and Ayman Zidan.

Upon completing his role in the series "Along Days", a romantic drama in which he played the leading role, Hassan was approached to take on the title role of King Farouk, a major project in Egypt. Though this was not the first time that Hassan is offered the title role of a major historic figure, as he played the role of Syria's most famous poet, Nizar Qabbani, in the series "Nizar Qabbani" in 2005. It has been later reported that Hassan was actually approached after a number of other Egyptian actors have turned down the role of Farouk. Not only was Hassan able to save a project that Dr. Lamis Gaber has spent the last 15 years of her life researching and writing, but he together with a team was able to turn it into a drama. In taking on the role of Farouk, Hassan who shares a resemblance to the Egyptian king, allegedly had to shave his hair during the four and a half months of shooting in addition to wearing a body-suit and heavy makeup to resemble Farouk in his final years on the throne.

On December 6, 2007, Hassan received the Gold Medal in the Best Actor's Award category shared with Egyptian actor Yehia El-Fakharany at the Cairo Festival for Arab Media for playing the title role in the 2007 Ramadan Egyptian hit television series "King Farouk".

Hasan's last television series, which was filmed in Morocco and Syria entitled Conflict on the Sand—a title that was changed from Days of Revenge—was released for worldwide broadcast in Ramadan of 2008 and was seen by many commentators as a revival of Beduin series in Arabic drama. The television series, a Beduin epic that takes place in the Gulf Beduin desert at the beginning of the 18th century, also starred Jordanian actress Saba Mubarak and Syrian actors Muna Wassef, Abdel Moneim Al Amayri, Hasan Awaytti and Basil Khayyat and is directed by Hatem Ali and written by Hany al-Saady. The series was produced by Dubai Media Incorporated in collaboration with Picture for Media Productions, a Syrian production company owned by renowned Syrian director Hatem Ali. Its estimated cost was over $6 million and it was based on the vision and poetry of Sheikh Mohammed bin Rashid Al Maktoum.

Hasan has recently finished filming his first cinematic role in Egypt entitled Mecano, which is scheduled for worldwide release on January 28, 2009. The movie also stars Lebanese actress, Nour, and Egyptian actor, Khaled El Sawi. This psycho-drama tells the story of a young architect, who is suffering from a rare disease that affects his short-term memory and who falls in love with Amira (played by Nour) who helps him overcome his ordeal.

Taim is the lead character of all five seasons of the hit Lebanese series Al Hayba which features many well known Arab celebrities such as Muna Wassef, Rouzaina Lazkani, Cyrine Abdelnour, Valerie Abou Chacra, Nadine Nassib Njeim, Nicole Saba, Dima Kandalaft and Aimée Sayah.

Taim also made an appearance in the American teen show Teen Wolf where he portrayed Simeon Alawi on Season 3 alongside other Arab celebrities such as Cyrine Abdelnour, Yasmin Sabri, Dorra Zarrouk, Kosai Khauli and Nesrine Tafesh

Filmography

Films
الهيبة فيلم
Essam_Osamah

TV Series
Al Haybat

ana

‘’(( Al amid ))’’

Personal life
Taim Hasan and his ex-wife, Syrian actress Dima Bayaa, announced their divorce after 10 years of marriage. Their fans were shocked because people thought this is one of the perfect marriages in the world of celebrities. In 2017, he married Egyptian TV presenter, Wafaa El Kilani.

References

External links
Official fan website

1976 births
Living people
Syrian male television actors
People from Tartus
Higher Institute of Dramatic Arts (Damascus) alumni
Syrian Alawites